Jalan Haji Sirat (Selangor state route B4) is a major road in Selangor, Malaysia.

List of junctions

Roads in Selangor